Waldemar Joseph Carl Steffen (23 November 1872 in Hamburg – 12 February 1965 in Hamburg) was a German track and field athlete who competed at the 1900 Summer Olympics in Paris, France. He tied for fourth in the high jump, clearing 1.70 metres. Steffen competed in the long jump.  He placed eighth of twelve with a best jump of 6.30 metres.  He also competed in the triple jump, in which he failed to make the top six, and the standing triple jump, in which he did not place in the top four.

References

External links

 De Wael, Herman. Herman's Full Olympians: "Athletics 1900". Accessed 18 March 2006.
 
 Waldemar Steffen's profile at Sports Reference.com

Athletes (track and field) at the 1900 Summer Olympics
Olympic athletes of Germany
German male long jumpers
German male high jumpers
German male triple jumpers
1872 births
1965 deaths
Olympic male high jumpers
Sportspeople from Hamburg